Tonda Hughes is an American professor of Nursing (in Psychiatry) and Associate Dean for Global Health Research at the School of Nursing at Columbia University. She is best known for her research of factors influencing the health of sexual minority women (lesbian and bisexual), particularly in the area of substance use. Hughes is the Principal Investigator of the Chicago Health and Life Experiences of Women Study, the longest running longitudinal study of sexual minority women’s health, with a focus on alcohol use and mental health.

Hughes is a Visiting Professor at Oxford Brookes University, and Honorary Professor at both Deakin University and University of Technology Sydney Faculty of Nursing and Midwifery. Prior to joining Columbia University in 2017, Hughes was a Collegiate Professor and Associate Dean for Global Health at the University of Illinois-Chicago College of Nursing. She was a Visiting Professor at the University of Melbourne from 2009-2014. In 2003, Hughes was inducted into the Chicago Gay and Lesbian Hall of Fame.

In 2001, Hughes was named as a fellow of the American Academy of Nursing. In 2014, she received the Betty Ford Award from the Association of Medical Education and Research in Substance Abuse and in 2015 was inducted into the Sigma Theta Tau International Nurse Researcher Hall of Fame. In 2017, Hughes received the Global Alliance for Behavioral Health and Social Justice Recognition Award.

She is a member of the University of Kentucky Hall of Fame. In 2017, she received the Achievement Award from the Gay and Lesbian Medical Association.

Personal life 
Hughes was raised in rural southeastern Kentucky. Her father, a coal miner, and her mother did not attend college. Hughes is openly lesbian. She came out while studying for a masters degree at the University of Kentucky.

References

American nurses
American women nurses
Living people
Year of birth missing (living people)
Columbia University faculty
Fellows of the American Academy of Nursing
American women academics
Lesbian academics
LGBT people from Kentucky
21st-century American women